A statue of basketball player Kareem Abdul-Jabbar by artists Julie Rotblatt Amrany and Omri Amrany is installed outside Los Angeles' Crypto.com Arena, in the U.S. state of California. The bronze sculpture was unveiled in 2012. It depicts Abdul-Jabbar's famous skyhook shots. Abdul-Jabbar was a member of the Lakers from 1975 to 1989.

References 

2012 establishments in California
2012 sculptures
Bronze sculptures in California
Monuments and memorials in Los Angeles
Outdoor sculptures in Greater Los Angeles
Sculptures of African Americans
Sculptures of men in California
South Park (Downtown Los Angeles)
Statues in Los Angeles
Statues of sportspeople